"Kids of the Baby Boom" is a song written by David Bellamy, and recorded by American country music duo The Bellamy Brothers.  It was released in January 1987 as the second single from the album Country Rap.  The song was The Bellamy Brothers' tenth and final number one on the country chart.  The single went to number one for one week and spent a total of fourteen weeks on the country chart.

Charts

References

1987 singles
1986 songs
The Bellamy Brothers songs
Song recordings produced by Emory Gordy Jr.
MCA Records singles
Curb Records singles
Songs written by David Bellamy (singer)